The Walnut Valley Festival is an acoustic music festival held annually in Winfield, Kansas, United States. The main genre of music is bluegrass, but a wide variety of other acoustic styles are represented. The festival is held on the Wednesday through Sunday that includes the third Saturday of September.

History

The first official "Walnut Valley Festival" was held in September 1972 and was organized by a trio of founders--Stuart Mossman, Joe Muret, & Bob Redford.  The Festival celebrated 50 years in 2022, and now features four stages (designated Stages I, II, III and IV) and 200+ hours of music over a long weekend, bringing nationally- and internationally-known performers to this small Kansas town. In 1999 the International Bluegrass Music Association named the Walnut Valley Festival as its first "Bluegrass Event of the Year" award winner.

The list of entertainers who have appeared on WVF stages includes Jimmy Driftwood, Doc Watson, Merle Watson, Lester Flatt, Mark O'Connor, Alison Krauss, Byron Berline, Dan Crary, Norman Blake, John Hartford, Tom Chapin, Merle Travis, Mike Cross, New Grass Revival, Hot Rize, Nickel Creek, Dixie Chicks, Tony Rice, Red Clay Ramblers, Gamble Rogers, Bryan Bowers, John McCutcheon, Tom Paxton, The Steel Wheels, and many more.

Besides the world-class paid performers, Winfield is known for its instrumental contests. The flagship contest is the National Flat-pick Guitar Championship. Other contests include the National Mandolin Championship, the National Bluegrass Banjo Championship, the National Hammer Dulcimer Championship, the National Mountain Dulcimer Championship, the International Autoharp Championship, the International Fingerstyle Guitar Championship, and an Old Time Fiddle contest. The instrument contests routinely see winners from across the US and abroad.

Campers, also, typically include visitors from many different states and countries. Many of them bring a musical instrument, and the event is known for the high quality of its campground jamming, with performers sometimes appearing on campground stages or joining jams after finishing their sets on the official stages. Campground stages operate well into the night, and include Stage 5, Stage 6, Stage 8, Finetime Stage and Stage 11 (songwriters stage).

There are typically 11,000-15,000 people in attendance, with campers lining up over a month prior to the festival in order to claim a choice campsite during Land Rush. Many bands that began as "Jam Bands" in the campgrounds have been invited to perform at the festival, including Driven, Haymakers, Old Sound, Steelwind, Pretend Friend, Walnut River String Band, the Matchsellers, and the Weda Skirts.

See also
 List of bluegrass music festivals
 List of festivals in the United States
 Kansas State Fair, starts the Friday that follows Labor Day in September,  held for 10 days

References

External links

 Official Site for the Walnut Valley Festival
 Picker's Paradise, an unofficial fan site for the festival
 Aerial photograph of the festival in 2003
 Stage 5

Folk festivals in the United States
Music festivals in Kansas
Bluegrass festivals
Tourist attractions in Cowley County, Kansas
Music festivals established in 1972